Tochal, is a mountain and ski resort located on the Alborz mountain range, adjacent to the metropolitan area of Tehran in northern Iran. It includes a  ridge.

A gondola lift runs from Tehran to the Tochal ski resort and hotel, all as a part of Tochal Complex.

Peaks
A number of peaks are accessible from the Tochal main ridge or by their own climbing paths. Peaks (from west to east) include:

 Lavarak: accessible by main Tochal ridge or Imamzade Davood climbing path.
 Bazarak: accessible by main Tochal ridge or Imamzade Davood climbing path.
 Palang-chal: accessible from Darakeh valley and Palangchal Shelter.
 Sar-Bazarak: accessible from Palangchal peak and main Tochal ridge.
 Shah-Neshin: accessible from Tochal main ridge, Hezarcham path and south (Abshar-Dogholoo) ridge.
 Tochal: The highest peak of the range, accessible by any climbing path that ends on the Tochal main ridge. The usual path from Tehran is by the south ridge (normally from Shirpala shelter and Siahsang hut).
 Spilit: through Band-yakh-chal and Shervin hut by rock climbing or Klakchal ridge.
 West Lezon: accessible from Tochal main ridge, Kolakchal shelter or Shirpala shelter.
 East Lezon or Piaz-chal: accessible from Tochal main ridge, Kolakchal shelter or Shirpala shelter.
 Kolak-chal: from Kolakchal shelter (through Golab-dareh valley, Vezbad valley or Jamshidieh park)
 Siah-band: from Dar-abad valley and Dar-abad hut.

Gondola lift

This gondola lift is used for accessing ski resorts and other recreational centers on the mountain. The gondola lift has four stations:

Parking, inns and some other facilities are available.
There is a restaurant and a rescue center. This station is in the middle of one of the ski slopes which is open only in mid winter. This station is also accessible through several climbing paths like Shirpala shelter, Osoon valley and Palang-chal shelter.
It is the last station of the gondola lift. This station is in the middle of the Tochal ski slope. The Tochal main peak is 30 minutes walk from this point. This station is also reachable from Hezar-cham climbing path from Station 5.

Location in central Alborz

Pictures

See also
 List of ski areas and resorts in Iran
 Tochal Complex
 Velenjak

External links

 Tochal website
 Tochal Overview
 6 days snow forecast and skiing weather for Tochal

Mountains of Iran
Mountaineering in Iran
Landforms of Tehran Province
Three-thousanders
Mountains of Tehran Province